Zachrysia trinitaria is a species of air-breathing land snail, a terrestrial pulmonate gastropod mollusk in the family Camaenidae or Pleurodontidae.

Distribution 
This species is already established in the USA, and is considered to represent a potentially serious threat as  a pest, an invasive species which could negatively affect agriculture, natural ecosystems, human health or commerce. Therefore it has been suggested that this species be given top national quarantine significance in the USA.

References

External links
 

Camaenidae
Gastropods described in 1858